Haicheng is the seat of the city of Beihai, Guangxi, People's Republic of China.

Administrative divisions 
Haicheng District is divided into 7 subdistricts and 1 town:

Subdistricts:
 Zhongjie Subdistrict (中街街道), Dongjie Subdistrict (东街街道), Xijie Subdistrict (西街街道), Haijiao Subdistrict (海角街道), Dijiao Subdistrict (地角街道), Gaode Subdistrict (高德街道), Yima Subdistrict (驿马街道)

The only town is Weizhou (涠洲镇)

See also 
 List of administrative divisions of Guangxi

References

External links 
 Official website (in Simplified Chinese)

County-level divisions of Guangxi
Beihai